Jeffrey Ross Hyman (May 19, 1951 – April 15, 2001), known professionally as Joey Ramone, was an American singer, best known as the lead vocalist and a founding member of the punk rock band Ramones. His image, voice, and his tenure with the Ramones made him a countercultural icon.

Early life 

Jeffrey Ross Hyman was born on May 19, 1951, in Queens, New York City, to a Jewish family. His parents were Charlotte (née Mandell) and Noel Hyman. He was born with a parasitic twin growing out of his back, which was incompletely formed and surgically removed. The family resided in Forest Hills, Queens, where Hyman and his future Ramones bandmates attended Forest Hills High School. He grew up with his brother Mickey Leigh. Though generally a happy person, Hyman was something of an outcast, diagnosed at 18 with obsessive–compulsive disorder and schizophrenia. His mother, Charlotte Lesher, divorced her first husband, Noel Hyman. She married a second time but was widowed when her second husband died in a car accident while she was on vacation.

Hyman was a fan of the Beatles, the Who, David Bowie, and the Stooges among other bands, particularly oldies and the Phil Spector-produced girl groups. His idol was Keith Moon of the Who. Hyman took up the drums at 13, and played them throughout his teen years before picking up an acoustic guitar at age 17.

Career

Sniper 
In 1972 Hyman joined the glam punk band Sniper. Sniper played at the Mercer Arts Center, Max's Kansas City and the Coventry, alongside the New York Dolls, Suicide, and Queen Elizabeth III. Hyman played with Sniper under the name Jeff Starship.
Hyman continued playing with Sniper until early 1974, when he was replaced by Alan Turner.

Ramones 

In 1974, Jeffrey Hyman co-founded the punk rock band the Ramones with friends John Cummings and Douglas Colvin. Colvin was already using the pseudonym "Dee Dee Ramone" and the others also adopted stage names using "Ramone" as their surname: Cummings became Johnny Ramone and Hyman became Joey Ramone. The name "Ramone" stems from Paul McCartney: he briefly used the stage name "Paul Ramon" during 1960–61, when the Beatles, still an unknown five-piece band called the Silver Beetles, did a tour of Scotland and all took up pseudonyms; and again on the 1969 Steve Miller album Brave New World, where he played the drums on one song using that name.

Ramone initially served as the group's drummer while Dee Dee Ramone was the original vocalist. However, when Dee Dee's vocal cords proved unable to sustain the demands of consistent live performances, Ramone's manager Thomas Erdelyi suggested Ramone switch to vocals. Mickey Leigh: I was shocked when the band came out. Joey was the lead singer and I couldn't believe how good he was. Because he'd been sitting in my house with my acoustic guitar, writing these songs like 'I Don't Care', fucking up my guitar, and suddenly he's this guy on stage who you can't take your eyes off of. After a series of unsuccessful auditions in search of a new drummer, Erdelyi took over on drums, assuming the name Tommy Ramone.

The Ramones were a major influence on the punk rock movement in the United States, though they achieved only minor commercial success. Their only record with enough U.S. sales to be certified gold in Ramone's lifetime was the compilation album Ramones Mania. Recognition of the band's importance built over the years, and they are now represented in many assessments of all-time great rock music, such as the Rolling Stone lists of the 50 Greatest Artists of All Time and 25 Greatest Live Albums of All Time, VH1's 100 Greatest Artists of Hard Rock, and Mojo's 100 Greatest Albums. In 2002, the Ramones were voted the second greatest rock and roll band ever in Spin, behind the Beatles.

In 1996, after a tour with the Lollapalooza music festival, the band played its final show and then disbanded.

Other projects 

One of Ramone's earliest side projects was with a band called The Seclusions in 1983. Ramone sung vocals alongside his brother Leigh on a cover of the song "Nothing Can Change the Shape of Things to Come" from the album Isolation For Creation. Also appearing on the track were Jimmy Destri, Holly Beth Vincent, Jimmy Ripp, Busta Jones, and Jay Dee Daugherty.

In 1985, Ramone joined Steven Van Zandt's music industry activist group Artists United Against Apartheid, which campaigned against the Sun City resort in South Africa. Ramone and 49 other recording artists – including Bob Dylan, Bruce Springsteen, Keith Richards, Lou Reed and Run DMC — collaborated on the song "Sun City", in which they pledged they would never perform at the resort.

In 1994, Ramone appeared on the Helen Love album Love and Glitter, Hot Days and Music, singing the track "Punk Boy". Helen Love returned the favor, singing on Ramone's song "Mr. Punchy".

In October 1996, Ramone headlined the "Rock the Reservation" alternative rock festival in Tuba City, Arizona. "Joey Ramone & the Resistance" (Daniel Rey on guitar, John Connor on bass guitar and Roger Murdock on drums) debuted Ramone's interpretation of Louis Armstrong's "Wonderful World" live, as well as Ramone's choice of Ramones classics and some of his other favorite songs, such as The Dave Clark Five's "Any Way You Want It", The Who's "The Kids are Alright" and The Stooges' "No Fun".

Ramone co-wrote and recorded the song "Meatball Sandwich" with Youth Gone Mad. For a short time before his death, he took the role of manager and producer for the punk rock band the Independents.

His last recording as a vocalist was backup vocals on the CD One Nation Under by the Dine Navajo rock group Blackfire. He appeared on two tracks, "What Do You See" and "Lying to Myself".

Ramone produced the Ronnie Spector EP She Talks to Rainbows in 1999. It was critically acclaimed but was not very commercially successful. The title track was previously on the Ramones' final studio album, ¡Adios Amigos!.

Vocal style 

Ramone's signature cracks, hiccups, snarls, crooning, and youthful voice made him one of punk rock's most recognizable voices. Allmusic.com wrote that "Joey Ramone's signature bleat was the voice of punk rock in America." As his vocals matured and deepened through his career, so did the Ramones' songwriting, leaving a notable difference from his initial melodic and callow style – two notable tracks serving as examples are "Somebody Put Something in My Drink" and "Mama's Boy". Dee Dee Ramone was quoted as saying "All the other singers [in New York] were copying David Johansen (of the New York Dolls), who was copying Mick Jagger... But Joey was unique, totally unique."

Illness and death 

In 1995, Ramone was diagnosed with lymphoma. He kept his condition private until it was revealed on March 19, 2001, that he was battling the disease. He died of the illness at New York-Presbyterian Hospital on April 15, 2001, a month before he would have turned 50. He was reportedly listening to the song "In a Little While" by U2 when he died. In an interview in 2014 for Radio 538, U2 lead singer Bono confirmed that Joey Ramone's family told him that Ramone listened to the song before he died, which Andy Shernoff (The Dictators) also confirmed. Joey's funeral was attended by former bandmates Tommy, Richie and C. J. Ramone, along with Debbie Harry and Chris Stein of Blondie, and Joan Jett. Ramone is interred at New Mount Zion Cemetery in Lyndhurst, New Jersey.

His solo album Don't Worry About Me was released posthumously in 2002, and features the single "What a Wonderful World", a cover of the Louis Armstrong standard. MTV News said: "With his trademark rose-colored shades, black leather jacket, shoulder-length hair, ripped jeans and alternately snarling and crooning vocals, Joey was the iconic godfather of punk."

Legacy 
On November 30, 2003, a block of East 2nd Street in New York City was officially renamed Joey Ramone Place. It is the block where Hyman once lived with bandmate Dee Dee Ramone and is near the former site of the music club CBGB, where the Ramones began their career. Hyman's birthday is celebrated annually during the "Joey Ramone Birthday Bash", hosted in New York City by his brother and, until 2007, his mother, Charlotte.

The Ramones were named as inductees to the Rock and Roll Hall of Fame as part of the class of 2002.

Several songs have been written in tribute to Ramone. Tommy, C. J., and Marky Ramone and Daniel Rey came together in 2002 to record Jed Davis' Joey Ramone tribute album, The Bowery Electric. Other tributes include "Hello Joe" by Blondie from the album The Curse of Blondie, "You Can't Kill Joey Ramone" by Sloppy Seconds, Joey by Raimundos, "I Wanna Be Your Joey Ramone" by Sleater-Kinney, "Red and White Stripes" by Moler and "Joey" by the Corin Tucker Band, "I Heard Ramona Sing" by Frank Black, Amy Rigby's "Dancin' With Joey Ramone" and "The Miracle (of Joey Ramone)" by U2.

In September 2010, the Associated Press reported that "Joey Ramone Place," a sign at the corner of Bowery and East Second Street, was New York City's most stolen sign. Drummer Marky Ramone thought Joey would appreciate that his sign would be the most stolen, adding "Now you have to be an NBA player to see it."

After several years in development, Ramone's second posthumous album was released on May 22, 2012. Titled ...Ya Know?, it was preceded on Record Store Day by a 7" single re-release of "Blitzkrieg Bop"/"Havana Affair".

On April 15, 2021, the 20th anniversary of Ramone's death, it was announced that Pete Davidson would portray Ramone in the upcoming Netflix biopic, I Slept with Joey Ramone which is based on the memoir of the same name written by Ramone's brother Mickey Leigh. Leigh will serve as an executive producer. The film is being made with the full cooperation and support of Ramone's estate, with a treatment written by Davidson and director Jason Orley.

In 2022, Brookfield Asset Management acquired a majority stake in the music-publishing rights of  Ramone for around US$10 million.

Discography

Solo 
 Don't Worry About Me (2002)
 ...Ya Know? (2012)

EPs 
 In a Family Way – Sibling Rivalry (1994)
 Ramones: Leathers from New York – The Ramones and Joey Ramone (solo) (1997)
 Christmas Spirit...In My House (2002)

Singles 
 "I Got You Babe" (1982) (Duet with Holly Beth Vincent)
 "Merry Christmas (I Don't Want To Fight Tonight) (Revised)" (2001)
 "What a Wonderful World" (2002)
 "Rock and Roll Is the Answer" / "There's Got to Be More to Life" (2012)

References

External links 

 
 
 

1951 births
2001 deaths
American male drummers
American male guitarists
American male singer-songwriters
American punk rock drummers
American punk rock guitarists
American punk rock singers
American rock songwriters
Burials at Hillside Cemetery (Lyndhurst, New Jersey)
Deaths from cancer in New York (state)
Deaths from lymphoma
Guitarists from New York (state)
Forest Hills High School (New York) alumni
Jewish American musicians
Jewish singers
Jewish rock musicians
Jewish punk rock musicians
Singer-songwriters from New York (state)
People from Forest Hills, Queens
People with parasitic twins
People with obsessive–compulsive disorder
People with schizophrenia
Joey
Record producers from New York (state)
20th-century American drummers
20th-century American guitarists
20th-century American singers
New York (state) Democrats
20th-century American male singers
Sanctuary Records artists